The Peyton Building and Peyton Annex is a historic seven-story building and annex in Spokane, Washington. The building was designed by Cutter & Malmgren, and built in 1898. It was built on the site of a former building known as the Great Eastern Building, designed by Herman Preusse and completed in 1890. The annex was designed by Robert Sweatt, and built in 1908. It has been listed on the National Register of Historic Places since March 15, 2005.

References

External links

National Register of Historic Places in Spokane County, Washington
Romanesque Revival architecture in Washington (state)
Early Commercial architecture in the United States
Buildings and structures completed in 1898